The German Open (currently known as the Grass Court Championships Berlin or bett1open) is a WTA Tour affiliated professional tennis tournament for women played in West Berlin, West Germany (until 1990), then Berlin, Germany from 1991 to 2008 following reunification. Held since 1896, it was one of the oldest tournaments for women. Until 1978 the tournament was held in Hamburg together with the men's tournament. From 1988, it was classified on the WTA Tour as a Tier I tournament.

After an absence of more than a decade, the tournament was announced to return to the WTA calendar for the 2020 season. However, the event was cancelled in April 2020 due to the COVID-19 pandemic and it would be due to return in 2021. The new event is classified as a Premier-level tournament and serve as a warm-up event towards the Wimbledon Championships, having switched its surface from clay to grass.

History

Past champions of the tournament include former world number ones Billie Jean King, Chris Evert, Steffi Graf, Monica Seles, Arantxa Sánchez Vicario, Martina Hingis, Amélie Mauresmo, Justine Henin, Ana Ivanovic and Dinara Safina.

Past finals

Singles

Doubles

Tournament names
 1896-1927:German Championships
 1928-1948:German International Championships
 1949-1970:West German Championships
 1971–1979: German Open
 1980: No tournament
 1981–1988: German Open
 1989–1990: Lufthansa Cup
 1991–1992: Lufthansa Cup German Open
 1993–2000: German Open
 2001–2002: Eurocard German Open
 2003: MasterCard German Open
 2004: Ladies German Open
 2005: Qatar Total German Open
 2006–2008: Qatar Telecom German Open
 2021–present: bett1open

See also 
 German Open Tennis Championships
 WTA Hamburg

References

Tennis tournaments in Germany
Clay court tennis tournaments
German
 
1896 establishments in Germany
2008 disestablishments in Germany
Women in Berlin